Change Me may refer to:

 Change Me (album), an album by Leehom Wang
 "Change Me" (Justin Bieber song), 2013
 "Change Me" (Keri Hilson song), 2009
 "Change Me" (Ruben Studdard song), 2006